Bulă is a fictional stock character of Romanian humor.

Bulă, a buffoon and coward, was "born" during the Nicolae Ceauşescu regime of Communist Romania. The name, among other meanings, is a one-letter deformation of "Pulă", a Romanian vulgar slang for "penis".

In 2006, the Romanian Television conducted a vote to determine whom the general public considers the 100 greatest Romanians of all time. Bulă was voted to be the 59th greatest Romanian (compare with humoristic voting for 100 greatest Finns).

Silvian Cenţiu, commenting on his show, A Transylvanian in Silicon Valley, wrote: "When in San Francisco and in New York I mentioned Bula, the omnipresent character in Romanian jokes, I was delighted to hear audience members laugh before I finished the joke – I knew they were Romanians."

References

Fictional Romanian people
Romanian humour
Stock characters in jokes